Landesbank Saar (short SaarLB) is a public-law corporation established in Saarbrücken and the largest credit and mortgage bond institute in Saarland. In 2017, the balance sheet total was around €14 billion. Core markets are Saarland and France, especially the northeast of the country.

Until December 31, 2013, shareholders of SaarLB were Bayerische Landesbank (BayernLB, 49.9 percent), Saarland (35.2 percent) and Sparkassenverband Saar (14.9 percent), after Bayerische Landesbank in the course of the financial crisis sold a share of 25.2 percent for 65 million euros to Saarland. This share ratio changed as of September 30, 2013, as Saarland Sparkassen converted previously held silent participations into so-called "hard core capital". At this date the participation rates amounted to 43.92 percent for BayernLB, 30.98 percent for Saarland and 25.1 percent for Sparkassenverband Saar.

As of 1 January 2014, BayernLB sold its remaining shares to Saarland, so that now Saarland is involved with 74.9 percent and Sparkassenverband with 25.1 percent in SaarLB.

References

External links

 Official Website
 

economy of Saarland
Landesbanks
Corporate finance
Banks established in 1941
German companies established in 1941